The 2021–22 season was the 124th season in the existence of SK Rapid Wien and the club's 73rd consecutive season in the top flight of Austrian football. In addition to the domestic league, Rapid Wien participated in this season's edition of the Austrian Cup and entered international football in the second qualifying round to the UEFA Champions League having finished 2nd in the previous Bundesliga season.

Squad

Squad statistics

Goal scorers

Disciplinary record

Transfers

In

Out

Pre-season and friendlies

Competitions

Overall record

Austrian Football Bundesliga

Results summary

Results by round

Regular season
The league fixtures were announced on 24 July 2021.

Table

Matches

Championship round

Table

Points were halved after the regular season.

Matches

Europa Conference League play-off

Final

Austrian Cup

UEFA Champions League

Second qualifying round
The draw for the second qualifying round was held on 16 June 2021.

UEFA Europa League

Third qualifying round

Play-off round

Group stage

The draw for the group stage was held on 27 August 2021.

Table

Games

UEFA Europa Conference League

Knockout round play-offs

References

Notes

SK Rapid Wien seasons
Rapid Wien